8th SFFCC Awards
December 14, 2009

Best Picture: 
 The Hurt Locker 
The 8th San Francisco Film Critics Circle Awards, honoring the best in film for 2009, were given on 14 December 2009.

Winners

Best Picture:
The Hurt Locker
Best Director: 
Kathryn Bigelow - The Hurt Locker
Best Original Screenplay: 
Inglourious Basterds - Quentin Tarantino
Best Adapted Screenplay: 
Fantastic Mr. Fox - Wes Anderson
Best Actor: 
Colin Firth - A Single Man
Best Actress:
Meryl Streep - Julie & Julia
Best Supporting Actor: 
Christian McKay - Me and Orson Welles
Best Supporting Actress: 
Mo'Nique - Precious
Best Animated Feature:
Coraline
Best Foreign Language Film: 
You, the Living (Du levande) • Sweden/Germany/France/Denmark/Norway/Japan
Best Documentary:
Anvil! The Story of Anvil
Best Cinematography:
A Serious Man - Roger Deakins
Marlon Riggs Award (for courage & vision in the Bay Area film community): 
Frazer Bradshaw - Everything Strange and New 
 Barry Jenkins - Medicine for Melancholy 
Special Citation:
Sita Sings the Blues
In Memoriam:
Rose Kaufman

External links
2009 San Francisco Film Critics Circle Awards

References
S.F. Critics name Hurt Locker best film of '09

San Francisco Film Critics Circle Awards
2009 film awards